Sucre Municipality is one of the 29 municipalities in Táchira, Venezuela. Its capital is Queniquea. Its area is 376 square kilometers. It had an estimated population of 10,000 in 2007.

Name
The municipality is one of several in Venezuela named "Sucre Municipality" in honour of Venezuelan independence hero Antonio José de Sucre.

External links
Government website (Spanish)

Municipalities of Táchira